Sar Cheshmeh (also Romanized as Sarchashmah and Sar Chashmeh) is a village in Sharabian Rural District, Mehraban District, Sarab County, East Azerbaijan Province, Iran. At the 2006 census, its population was 338, in 77 families.

References 

Populated places in Sarab County